Mauritz Sandberg (15 November 1895 – 4 November 1981) was a Swedish footballer. He competed in the men's tournament at the 1920 Summer Olympics.

References

External links

1895 births
1981 deaths
Swedish footballers
Sweden international footballers
Olympic footballers of Sweden
Footballers at the 1920 Summer Olympics
Sportspeople from Västra Götaland County
Association football forwards
IFK Göteborg players